Miguel Magalhães may refer to:

 Maga (footballer, born 1999), Miguel Ângelo Moreira de Magalhães, Portuguese football right-back for Vitória B
 Miguel Maga (born 2002), Miguel Ângelo Gomes Ferreira Magalhães, Portuguese football right-back for Vitória